Hyperplatys griseomaculata is a species of longhorn beetles of the subfamily Lamiinae. It was described by Fisher in 1926, and is known from Trinidad.

References

Beetles described in 1926
Endemic fauna of Trinidad and Tobago
Acanthocinini